= 2026 World Aquatics Junior High Diving Championships =

- Host city: Fort Lauderdale, United States
- Date: May 16–17, 2026

The 2026 World Aquatics Junior High Diving Championships were held in Fort Lauderdale in United States from 16 to 17 May 2026.

== Medal summary ==
=== Men's events ===
Event	Gold		Silver		Bronze	
15m (15–16)	Dmytro Vyshyvanov; Ukraine	272.20	Tanner Lange; United States	261.10	Not awarded	
15m (17–19)	Tao Baijing; China	352.95	Wang Zile; China	348.20	James Boardman; United States	267.35

=== Women's events ===
Event	Gold		Silver		Bronze	
15m (15–16)	Grace Yeomans; United States	151.35	Not awarded			
15m (17–19)	Kelly-Ann Tessier; Canada	252.00	Caitlyn Padgett; Canada	242.50	Fiona Keilly; Canada	216.65

== Medal table ==
* Host nation (United States)

Rank	Nation	Gold	Silver	Bronze	Total
1	Canada	1	1	1	3
1	United States*	1	1	1	3
3	China	1	1	0	2
4	Ukraine	1	0	0	1
Totals (4 entries)		4	3	2	9
